The 2013 Bet-at-home Cup Kitzbühel was a men's tennis tournament played on outdoor clay courts. It was the 69th edition of the Austrian Open Kitzbühel, as part of the World Tour 250 series of the 2013 ATP World Tour. It took place at the Tennis stadium Kitzbühel in Kitzbuehel Austria, from July 28 through August 3.

Singles main draw entrants

Seeds

 1 Rankings are as of July 22, 2013

Other entrants
The following players received wildcards into the singles main draw:
  Andreas Haider-Maurer
  Mate Pavić
  Dominic Thiem

The following players received entry from the qualifying draw:
  Martin Fischer
  Jan Hájek
  Dennis Novak
  Antonio Veić

The following player received entry as a lucky loser:
  Aldin Šetkić

Withdrawals
Before the tournament
  Pablo Andújar
  Roberto Bautista-Agut (rib injury)
  Guido Pella
  Viktor Troicki (suspension)

Retirements
  Horacio Zeballos (right rib injury)

Doubles main draw entrants

Seeds

 Rankings are as of July 22, 2013

Other entrants
The following pairs received wildcards into the doubles main draw:
  Carlos Becke /  Philipp Kohlschreiber
  Gerald Melzer /  Jürgen Melzer

Finals

Singles

  Marcel Granollers defeated  Juan Mónaco, 0–6, 7–6(7–3), 6–4

Doubles

  Martin Emmrich /  Christopher Kas defeated  František Čermák /  Lukáš Dlouhý, 6–4, 6–3

References

External links
Official website

Bet-at-home Cup Kitzbuhel
Austrian Open Kitzbühel
Kit